The Crab Orchard and Egyptian Railway  (formerly American Rail Heritage, Ltd. d/b/a Crab Orchard, and Egyptian Railroad Company) is a Class III common carrier shortline railroad that operates in the cities of Marion and Herrin in the Southern Illinois region. It is most historically recognized by the FRA for being the last U.S. railroad of any kind to use steam locomotives exclusively in regular revenue freight service up until 1986.

Overview 

It also has three different interchange points with two Class I railroads. Near their main offices in downtown Marion, the railroad has a junction with Union Pacific's Marion Subdivision; another interchange is located in the nearby Marion suburb of Bainbridge with BNSF Railway's Beardstown Subdivision. A second BNSF connection with the same line is also present in the Herrin district. Most of the CO&E Railroad's revenue freight products primarily consist of coal, lumber, petroleum, grain, steel, paper, chemicals, manufactured goods, and railcar repair service.

History

Background: 1970s 

On , the Crab Orchard & Egyptian railroad was first founded and incorporated under the name of American Rail Heritage Ltd. and the new company started off by creating a vintage tourist line operation alongside Illinois Central Gulf owned trackage. Their tourist runs would go west towards the old Crab Orchard Refuge railroad junction near Ordill where the train would do a brief turn-around and eventually make a return trip back to the passenger depot.

Locomotive #5 was rebuilt after its first season in service. The saddle tank and coal bunker were removed and a tender purchased from the Illinois Central Gulf in nearby Carbondale, Illinois, was added in its place. The rebuild resulted in a locomotive that looked more at home pulling the passenger trains, and also gave #5 additional fuel and water capacity.

About two years later, a second and much larger steam engine was purchased from John Thompson of Chicago, Illinois. The locomotive was in storage in the Central Vermont Railway roundhouse in New London, Connecticut and was moved to Marion in early 1975 to further complement the CO&E Railroad's historic roster. This new Canadian-built locomotive was former Roberval & Saguenay 2-8-0 #17, although since it was not in operable condition, the new engine couldn't be used in immediate service until an overhaul was performed. The building was completely gutted, leaving building little more than an empty brick shell.

All was not necessarily lost after this incident when only four months later, the Illinois Central Gulf sold the CO&E Railroad its trackage and property altogether after they discontinued freight service along the entire route. These changes in operation immediately took off successfully as freight customers started growing rapidly with CO&E's new locally owned and operated service. Piggyback service was also eventually added in  when a large fleet of more than 200 new flatcars and 600 highway trailers painted for the CO&E Railroad were delivered. A new engine was acquired at the same time to help switch cars around when a small Davenport 35-Ton switcher arrived on the property in 1978. Not long afterward, the first test run of the 2-8-0 steamer finally occurred on  after an extensive four-year overhaul and quickly became the primary power of choice by July.

Last American steam railroad: 1980s 

As the next decade started for the Crab Orchard & Egyptian railroad, steam-powered freight service was still expanding and the railroad purchased several different freight cars of its own over the next few years; many of these included coal hoppers, covered hoppers and 25 former Ahnapee & Western boxcars, all of which were lettered for the CO&E with their classic pyramid logo.

The arrival of the diesel proved to be fortuitous.

The CO&E Railroad's fame of pulling common carrier freight trains, including intermodal piggyback cars, with a steam locomotive, finally came to an abrupt end due to this incident. The incident also marked the end of an era for American-wide railroading in general.

As it was, the railroad had been preparing for the post-steam era. The arrival of the diesel was evidence of this. #17 had been in service for seven years and was approaching a federally mandated overhaul. The major work that would have been required was the replacement of the tubes and flues running from the firebox to the smokebox in the boiler. The withdrawal from service of #17 for the required overhaul would have marked the end of her career, as there was no plan to overhaul #17 when its flue time ran out.

A third former Missouri Pacific SW1200, #1161 was eventually purchased and joined the roster in the spring of 1987. Before arrival, it was given a full coat of paint that matched Marion's local high school colors of blue and yellow; however, the #1147 was never painted into the railroad's scheme and was only given a patch job with their pyramid logo.

Current day: 1990s - Present 

While the modern-day Crab Orchard & Egyptian Railroad has been operating common carrier services across Williamson County since the 1970s, the 1980s did see a big difference in the way things were done with the railroad. Intermodal piggyback service started winding down in 1982 and was eventually phased out four years later due to deregulation within the railroad industry. The CO&E's entire roster of freight cars was also sold off early in the decade with the growing popularity of independently and privately owned freight car shippers, many of such were sold to other shortlines for leasing purposes.

In 1995, the railroad's small, but longest-lasting, "Rosi-Clare" Davenport 35-tonner was finally retired from the roster after nearly 20 years of service with the CO&E Railroad. It was later donated to the American Fluorite Museum in the engine's namesake town of Rosiclare, Illinois the same year where it currently resides in full CO&E paint and lettering for display purposes. With Rosi-Clare's departure, a new EMD SW1 switcher would later be purchased from the former Sahara Coal Company as a replacement. It was repainted into the CO&E Railroad's "Marion District" colors of blue and yellow and given the new name and number of "The Six" on the cab side. During , The Six was eventually given the formal name of William "Bill" E. Schreiber in devotion to one of the CO&E's original founders who had recently died in 2006.

The current traffic base for the CO&E Railroad consists of more than 10 different industrial areas with rail access, all of which ship various commodities on both lines. In the Marion District, there is Warren Oil (liquids and lubricants), Perma-Treat (treated lumber), North Side Wholesale, Illinois Transload, and P&S Grain. Some of its largest customers here are Southern Illinois Railcar, which provides freight-car repair services, Hastie Mining, and Excel Mining, which ships equipment and supplies used in mining applications, and General Dynamics, a government contractor who makes ammunition for the military.

Inside the railroad's Herrin District, there is the CO&E's largest customer, Whirlpool-Maytag's appliance factory, Stone Container (a cardboard box plant), DJM Oil (fuels and lubricants), and East Side Wholesale. Many of these plants have closed down over time within the past few years though, such as the case with Whirlpool shutting down their factory in December 2006 and DJM Oil burning down to the ground in 2007.

Sale and name change
In late 2012, American Rail Heritage, Ltd. sold the railroad to Progressive Rail Incorporated, with December 19, 2012, being the final day of operations for the old company.  The railroad is now known as Crab Orchard & Egyptian Railway, a Division of Progressive Rail Incorporated.

Equipment

Current active roster 

Over its three-decade history, the Crab Orchard and Egyptian's locomotive roster has seen a large transition between steam power back in the 1970s and the present-day diesel power currently running; overall they have owned a total of seven different engines from four different locomotive builders over the course of its time. The modern roster comprises only two EMD SW1200's, all of which are fully painted into CO&E's present scheme; however, their individual colors correspond to their own district's local high school colors.

Past historic roster 

One of the railroad's former steam engines, 2-8-0 #17, is most widely known for holding the historic title as the last operating common carrier steam locomotive in America. It currently sits on display at the Boone and Scenic Valley Railroad in Boone, Iowa and is still painted with the CO&E's classic pyramid logo. The railroad's other steam engine, 2-4-2T #5, is currently in storage at the St. Louis, Iron Mountain and Southern Railway in Jackson, Missouri and pending further restoration.

As for the CO&E Railroad's very first diesel switcher, SW1200 #1147, it only spent three years on the shortline before it was returned to Precision National in 1989 after originally being acquired in August 1986. This company would later sell the engine to the Alcoa Terminal Railroad near Knoxville, Tennessee the same year where it currently remains and works today.

See also 
List of Illinois railroads
List of heritage railroads in the United States
Northwestern Steel and Wire

Notes

References

 
 
 
 Railroad Fallen Flags CO&E historical account, including a few photographs.
 Greg's Steam & Diesel Gallery Photograph & brief information about CO&E's last steam engine.
 Carr Tracks – Steam Engine #17 Short details of the #17 in piggyback service, along with CO&E's logo.
 Union Pacific Railroad Crab Orchard & Egyptian Customer Profile

External links 

 Official Website
  Progressive Rail Incorporated

Illinois railroads
Switching and terminal railroads
Railway companies established in 1971
Spin-offs of the Illinois Central Gulf Railroad
Companies based in Williamson County, Illinois
Marion, Illinois